Dun is a commune in the Ariège department in the Occitanie region in southwestern France. In 1973, the commune Dun was expanded with the former communes Merviel, Engraviès and Senesse-de-Senabugue.

Population

See also
Communes of the Ariège department

References

Communes of Ariège (department)
Ariège communes articles needing translation from French Wikipedia